Seeley-Swan High School is an American public high school located in Seeley Lake, Montana, United States. It is a part of the Missoula County Public Schools, and the only school in the district that does not lie within the city boundaries of Missoula. The school fluctuates in size from about 90 students to 110 students depending on the year. As of 2014 there were 111 students. This rise and fall of students gives the school the chance to jump back and forth from a class C to a class B school. Seeley-Swan High School gets its name because the Swan Valley residents commute to Seeley for high school. The school has been recognized state and nationwide for academic excellence. It is only 52 miles from Missoula and 63 from Bigfork. It is located between the Swan Range and Mission Mountains.

Programs
 Band  Seeley-Swan offers concert band, marching band, and jazz band.
 Orchestra
 Choir
 Drama

Athletics
 Boys basketball 
 Girls basketball
 Cross country
 Football
 Golf
 Volleyball
 Track and field

Clubs and activities
 Greenhouse
 National Honors Society 
 Outdoor club
 Student Government
 Yearbook

References

Public high schools in Montana
Schools in Missoula County, Montana